The Sky Tower is a telecommunications and observation tower in Auckland, New Zealand. Since its completion in 1997 the Sky Tower has become an iconic landmark in Auckland's skyline, due to its height and design.

The tower is part of the SkyCity Auckland casino complex, originally built in 1994–1997 for Harrah's Entertainment. Several upper levels are accessible to the public, attracting an average of 1,150 visitors per day (over 415,000 per year).

Public facilities

The Sky Tower has several upper levels that are accessible to the public:

 Level 50: Sky Cafe
 Level 51: Main Observation Deck
 Level 52: Orbit 360° Dining
 Level 53: The Sugar Club restaurant, SkyWalk and SkyJump
 Level 60: Sky Deck

There is also a brasserie-style buffet located one floor above the main observatory level. It has three observation decks at different heights, each providing 360-degree views of the city.

The jump is guide-cable-controlled to prevent jumpers from colliding with the tower in case of wind gusts. Climbs into the antenna mast portion ( heights) are also possible for tour groups, as is a walk around the exterior.

Construction

Project history

The tower was constructed as a part of the Skycity casino precinct. The Skycity Entertainment Group's initial brief for the project were that they required a tower that was both a high-quality tourist attraction, and a marketable telecommunications facility. Fletcher Construction was the contracted builder for the project while engineering firm Beca Group provided the design management and coordination, structural, geotechnical, civil, mechanical, electrical, plumbing, lighting and fire engineering services. Harrison Grierson provided surveying services. It was designed by Gordon Moller of Craig Craig Moller Architects and has received a New Zealand Institute of Architects National Award as well as regional awards. The project architect was Les Dykstra. Taking two years and nine months to construct, the tower was opened on 3 August 1997.

Facts and figures
The tower is constructed of high-performance reinforced concrete. The main shaft was built using climbing formwork.

The upper levels were constructed from composite materials, structural steel, precast concrete and reinforced concrete, and the observation decks clad in aluminium with blue/green reflective glass. A structural steel framework supports the upper mast structure. It had to be lifted into place using a crane attached to the structure, as it would have been too heavy for a helicopter to lift. To then remove the crane, another crane had to be constructed attached to the upper part of the Sky Tower structure, which dismantled the big crane, and was in turn dismantled into pieces small enough to fit into the elevator.

Safety
As a safety precaution the Sky Tower's lifts have special technology installed to detect movement (such as swaying due to high wind) and will automatically slow down. If the building sway exceeds predetermined safety levels the lifts will return to the ground floor and remain there until the high winds and building sway have abated.

The Sky Tower is built to withstand an 8.0 magnitude earthquake located within a  radius. There are three fireproof rooms on levels 44, 45, and 46 to provide refuge in the event of an emergency, while the central service lift shaft and stairwells are also fire-safety rated.

Telecommunications
The tower is also used for telecommunications and broadcasting with the Auckland Peering Exchange (APE) being located on Level 48. The aerial at the top of the tower hosts the largest FM combiner in the world which combines with 58 wireless microwave links located above the top restaurant to provide a number of services. These include television, wireless internet, RT, and weather measurement services.

The tower is Auckland's primary FM radio transmitter, and is one of four infill terrestrial television transmitters in Auckland, serving areas not covered by the main transmitter at Waiatarua in the Waitākere Ranges. A total of twenty-three FM radio stations and six digital terrestrial television multiplexes broadcast from the tower. Two VHF analogue television channels broadcasting from the tower were switched off in the early hours of Sunday 1 December 2013 as part of New Zealand's digital television transition.

Transmission frequencies
H = Horizontal V = Vertical 

The following table contains television and radio frequencies currently operating from the Sky Tower:

Television broadcasting

Radio broadcasting

Lighting

SkyCity Auckland lights the Sky Tower to show support for a range of organisations and charities. SkyCity has a lighting policy and the public is invited to suggest additional occasions in line with this policy. Common lighting events include:

 All colours = New Year's Eve/New Year’s Day
 Blue = Blue September (prostate cancer awareness month in NZ)
 Pink = Breast Cancer Awareness Month | Mother's Day
 Red & Green = Christmas
 Red, Orange, Yellow, Green, Blue, Purple, Pink, Gold & White = New Year's Eve 
 Red & Gold = Chinese New Year
 Green = Saint Patrick's Day
 Red top = Anzac Day (with Poppy emblem projection) | Cure Kids Red Nose Day (fundraising appeal for children's health research)
 Red, Orange, Yellow, Green, Blue and Purple = Pride Month
 Orange at the base fading to yellow at the top = Matariki
 Green base and yellow top = Daffodil Day (Cancer Society New Zealand) 

 No lighting (except aircraft warning lights) = Earth Hour | Day in memorial of the death of the head of state, the governor-general, the prime minister, any governmental member or important people.

The tower is lit up for special occasions. Examples include New Zealand's 2021 vaccination campaign, with the tower illuminated in blue and white when 80% and 90% vaccination rates were achieved. The tower was blue and yellow in early March 2022 in solidarity with Ukraine over the 2022 Russian invasion. After SkyCity initially refused requests from members of the public to lend support, Phil Goff as mayor of Auckland intervened and the Sky Tower was one of three Auckland landmarks that was lit up for three days (the others were the Auckland Harbour Bridge and Auckland War Memorial Museum). The tower went blue to honour the death of Constable Matthew Hunt. Also in March 2022, the tower was red celebrating the Auckland Arts Festival.

Energy efficient lighting
The top half of the Sky Tower is lit by energy efficient LED lighting which replaced the original metal halide floodlights in May 2009. The LEDs can produce millions of different colour combinations controlled by a DMX lighting controller. The original lights used 66 per cent more energy than the current LED system. The bottom half remained lit by metal halide lamps, until they too were upgraded to LED lighting in 2019.

Energy conservation initiatives
In an effort to promote power saving, SkyCity turned off the tower lighting in Winter 2008, retaining only the flashing red aviation lights. SkyCity is also minimising façade flood lighting across its complex. Simon Jamieson, general manager SkyCity Auckland Hotels Group, said: "Like every New Zealander, we are concerned about the country's electricity supply, and we believe it is our responsibility to make this move to assist with the power saving request." The tower was reilluminated on 4 August in support of New Zealand athletes competing at the Beijing Olympics.

Events
The Sky Tower is used in support of special charity events. The Leukemia and Blood Foundation of New Zealand organises annual fundraising stair climb challenges, notably the "Firefighters Sky Tower Stair Challenge" which sees firefighters from around New Zealand race up 1,108 steps (out of 1,267 total steps). Climbing the Sky Tower stairs has been described as a "vertical marathon".

The Sky Tower is also the venue of the annual "Tower de Force" competition. It includes a climb up 1,226 steps (out of 1,267 total steps), and various other military skills tests that change yearly. Participants include the RNZAF, RNZN, New Zealand Army, New Zealand Defence Force veterans, New Zealand Police and, more recently, units from the New Zealand Cadet Forces. The competition is used to raise funds for numerous charities, including in 2019 Mike King's The Key to Life Charitable Trust.

See also
 List of tallest structures in New Zealand
 Macau Tower (inspired by the Sky Tower, designed by the same company)
 Sydney Tower (the second tallest observation tower in the Southern Hemisphere)

References

External links

 Sky Tower (official website)
 
 Explore the Sky Tower (interactive Sky Tower)
 360° view from Sky Deck (from Google)
 Orbit 360° Dining (official website)
 Photographs of the Sky Tower held in Auckland Libraries' heritage collections.

Buildings and structures in Auckland
Towers with revolving restaurants
Radio masts and towers
Lookouts in Auckland
Observation towers
Towers completed in 1997
Towers in New Zealand
Tourist attractions in Auckland
1990s architecture in New Zealand
Bungee jumping sites
Auckland CBD